Rahul Dravid is a retired Indian international cricketer.  in both Test and One Day International (ODI) cricket in matches organised by the International Cricket Council (ICC). Nicknamed "The Wall" for his ability of "... fending off the fiercest, the fastest and the wiliest of bowlers around the world", he scored 36 centuries (scores of 100 runs or more) in Test cricket and 12 in One Day Internationals (ODI) between his debut in 1996 and retirement in 2011. He was named as one of the five Wisden Cricketers of the Year in 2000, as well as the ICC Test Player of the Year and ICC Player of the Year in 2004.

Dravid scored his first Test century in January 1997 against South Africa. In a man-of-the-match performance, he made 148 runs spanning nine hours and took India to their only draw of the series. He made centuries in both innings of a match when he scored 190 and 103 not out in the final Test of the 1998–99 series against New Zealand. He repeated the feat in March 2005 when he scored 110 and 135 against Pakistan in another man-of-the-match performance, leading India to victory in the second of the three-match series. Scoring 180 in a fifth-wicket partnership of 376 with VVS Laxman, in the Second Test of the Border-Gavaskar Trophy in 2001, Dravid helped lead India to victory by 171 runs despite being asked to follow-on by the Australians.  His partnership with Laxman was the third-highest for the fifth wicket in Test cricket history. Dravid's highest Test score of 270, achieved in April 2004 in Rawalpindi, helped India to an innings victory against Pakistan. The performance was the fourth-highest score by an Indian batsman in Test cricket. He scored centuries against all Test playing nations and was the first cricketer to score centuries in all 10 Test playing nations.

Dravid's first ODI century was made against Pakistan in May 1997. He followed that with six centuries in 1999, including two in the 1999 World Cup (against Kenya and Sri Lanka); in the latter he was involved in a then-record 318-run partnership with Sourav Ganguly. His highest score of 153 was made the same year against New Zealand. His total came as part of a record second-wicket partnership of 331 with Sachin Tendulkar and led India to the second-highest ODI total at that time.

Key

Test centuries

One Day International centuries

Rahul Dravid centuries and results for India

References

Sources
 Prabhudesai, Devendra (2005): The Nice Guy Who Finished First: A Biography of Rahul Dravid, Rupa Publications India. .
 Bal, Sambit & Banjar, Sanjay (2012): Rahul Dravid: Timeless Steel, The Walt Disney Company India Pvt. Ltd. .

External links
 
 

Indian cricket lists
Dravid, Rahul